Mohanlal Pandya was an Indian freedom fighter, social reformer and one of the earliest followers of Mahatma Gandhi. Along with fellow Gandhians like Narhari Parikh and Ravi Shankar Vyas, Pandya was a key organizer of nationalist revolts in Gujarat, and a leading figure in the fight against alcoholism, illiteracy, untouchability, and a major proponent of women's freedoms and Gandhian values.

In 1909, Pandya threw a bomb on Viceroy Minto and his wife, in Ahmedabad. The Mintos escaped unhurt.

Pandya was a close associate of both Gandhi and Sardar Vallabhbhai Patel during the Indian Independence Movement.

Mohanlal Pandya was nicknamed as "Onion Thief" ("Dungli Chor") by Gandhi because he had harvested onion from the land which was taken away by the British Government.

See also
Bardoli Satyagraha

References

Indian independence activists from Gujarat
People from Gujarat
Gandhians
Year of death missing
Year of birth missing
Indian social reformers